This is a list of notable hotels in Puerto Rico.

Hotels in Puerto Rico

 Hacienda El Jibarito
 Hacienda Gripiñas
 Hacienda Juanita
 Mayagüez Resort & Casino

Ponce

 The Fox Hotel
 Hotel Meliá
 Hotel Ponce Intercontinental
 Ponce Plaza Hotel & Casino
 Solace by the Sea

San Juan

 Caribe Hilton Hotel 
 Condado Vanderbilt Hotel
 Hotel El Convento
 La Concha Resort
 Normandie Hotel (closed)
 San Juan Marriott Resort & Stellaris Casino

See also

 List of casinos in Puerto Rico
 List of companies of Puerto Rico
 Lists of hotels – hotel list articles on Wikipedia

External links
 

Hotels
Puerto Rico